Fresh River may refer to one of several rivers in the United States:

Fresh River (Massachusetts), a tributary of the Weymouth Back River
Fresh River (New Hampshire), a tributary of the Piscassic River
"Fresh River", a historic name for the Connecticut River